The Team Mini-Max AeroMax is an American amateur-built aircraft and light-sport aircraft, produced by Team Mini-Max of Niles, Michigan. The aircraft is supplied as a kit for amateur construction.

Design and development
The narrow fuselage allows the pilot to sit in the cockpit with his or her legs on the outside of the aircraft, with feet on the external rudder pedals.

The aircraft is made from pre-fabricated metal components and CNC laser-cut plywood parts. The main landing gear is made from sprung steel and mounts drum brakes. The elevator trim system is electric. The aircraft's recommended engine the  Hirth F-23 two-stroke powerplant. Tricycle landing gear, tundra tires and floats are under development. Construction time from the supplied kit is estimated as 200–300 hours.

A tandem two seat model is also under development by the company.

As of August 2012, the design does not appear on the Federal Aviation Administration's list of approved special light-sport aircraft.

Specifications (AeroMax)

References

External links

Homebuilt aircraft
Light-sport aircraft
High-wing aircraft
Single-engined tractor aircraft